Eurytyla is a genus of moths in the family Gracillariidae.

Species
Eurytyla automacha Meyrick, 1893

External links
Global Taxonomic Database of Gracillariidae (Lepidoptera) 

Gracillariinae
Gracillarioidea genera